The 2015 WGC-Cadillac Match Play was the 17th WGC-Cadillac Match Play Championship, played April 29 – May 3 at TPC Harding Park in San Francisco, California. It was the second of four World Golf Championships in 2015. Top-ranked Rory McIlroy defeated Gary Woodland  in the final, for his second win in a WGC event, after his win in the 2014 WGC-Bridgestone Invitational.		

On September 30, 2014, Cadillac was announced as the new title sponsor.

Field
The field consisted of the top 64 players available from the Official World Golf Ranking on April 19. However, the seedings were based on the World Rankings on April 26.

Luke Donald (ranked 50 on April 19, personal reasons), Tim Clark (ranked 57, injury), and Phil Mickelson (ranked 18, personal reasons) did not compete, allowing entry for Miguel Ángel Jiménez (ranked 65), Francesco Molinari (ranked 66), and Mikko Ilonen (ranked 67).

Two players made their WGC debut: Andy Sullivan and Ben Martin.

Nationalities in the field

Past champions in the field

Format
A new format was introduced in 2015. Previously, the Championship was a single elimination match play event. Beginning in 2015, the championship started with pool play, with 16 groups of four players playing round-robin matches, on Wednesday through Friday. There are no halved matches in pool play with extra holes played to determine the winner. The top 16 seeded players were allocated to the 16 groups, one in each group. The remaining 48 players were placed into three pools (seeds 17–32, seeds 33–48, seeds 49–64). Each group had one player randomly selected from each pool to complete the group.

The winners of each group advanced to a single-elimination bracket on the weekend, with the round of 16 and quarterfinals on Saturday, and the semi-finals, finals, and consolation match on Sunday. If two players are tied at the top of the group, the result of their head-to-head match determines the group winner. If three players are tied, the winner is determined by a sudden-death playoff.

Rank – Official World Golf Ranking on April 26, 2015.

Results

Pool play
Players were divided into 16 groups of four players and played round-robin matches on Wednesday to Friday.
Round 1 – April 29    
Round 2 – April 30     
Round 3 – May 1

Notes: Round 1

Of the 32 matches played, 14 were "upsets" with the lower seeded player beating the higher seeded player. These included #3 Henrik Stenson (lost to #60 John Senden), #6 Justin Rose (lost to #56 Marc Leishman), #7 Jason Day (lost to #49 Charley Hoffman), and #9 Adam Scott (lost to #64 Francesco Molinari).

Notes: Round 2

Of the 32 matches played, 16 were upsets. These included #5 Jim Furyk (lost to #44 Thongchai Jaidee), #7 Day (lost to #38 Branden Grace), #8 Dustin Johnson (lost to #37 Charl Schwartzel), #9 Scott (lost to #36 Paul Casey), and #10 Sergio García (lost to #39 Bernd Wiesberger). Two players, #13 Rickie Fowler and #60 John Senden, were guaranteed to advance.

Notes: Round 3

Of the 32 matches played, 18 were upsets. These included #2 Jordan Spieth (lost to #26 Lee Westwood), #3 Stenson (lost to #23 Bill Haas), #4 Bubba Watson (lost to #29 Louis Oosthuizen), #7 Day (lost to #24 Zach Johnson), #9 Scott (lost to #25 Chris Kirk), and #10 García (lost to #30 Jamie Donaldson). Day, Scott and Jimmy Walker were the only top seeds to lose all three matches. Only five of the top seeds advanced: #1 Rory McIlroy, #5 Furyk, #12 J. B. Holmes, #13 Fowler, and #16 Hideki Matsuyama. 12 of the 16 group winners advanced with perfect 3–0 records. Three groups winners advanced based on head-to-head tie-breaker and one group went to a three-way sudden-death playoff. Branden Grace defeated Zach Johnson and Charley Hoffman on the third extra hole in group 7. In Group 11, all six matches of the three rounds were upsets. A total of 18 of the 96 matches went extra holes, causing some to suggest altering the format next year to include halved matches.

Final 16 bracket

The match between Rory McIlroy and Paul Casey was completed on May 3 having been all square after 21 holes when it became too dark to continue.

Breakdown by country

Prize money breakdown

 Source:

References

External links

Coverage on the European Tour's official site

WGC Match Play
Golf in California
WGC-Cadillac Match Play Championship
WGC-Cadillac Match Play Championship
WGC-Cadillac Match Play Championship
WGC-Cadillac Match Play Championship
WGC-Cadillac Match Play Championship